Thomas Carroll (born 1992 in Clareen, County Offaly, Ireland) is an Irish sportsperson.  He plays hurling with his local club Seir Kieran and has been a member of the Offaly senior inter-county team since 2011.

Playing career

Club

Carroll plays his club hurling with the Seir Kieran club and has enjoyed some success.  He first came to prominence at juvenile and underage levels, winning a county under-16 'B' title in 2007.

Carroll later played for the club's minor team but enjoyed little success in this grade.  He is currently a member of the Seir Kieran under-21 and senior teams.  He played on the losing side when Seir Kieran were defeated by Coolderry in the 2010 county under-21 final.

Inter-county

Carroll first played for Offaly as a member of the county's minor hurling team in 2008.  He enjoyed three years with Offaly in that grade but enjoyed little success.  He is currently a member of the Offaly under-21 team.

In 2011 Carroll made his senior debut for Offaly in a pre-season Walsh Shield game against UCD. Offaly later went on to win the final of that competition, with Carroll scoring a goal against Carlow in the final.

Carroll made his senior championship debut when he came on as a substitute against Cork in a 2-17 to 2-16 defeat in the 2011 All-Ireland qualifiers.

References

1992 births
Living people
Seir Kieran hurlers
Offaly inter-county hurlers